Aeroflot Flight 065 was a scheduled passenger flight operated by the International Civil Aviation Directorate division of Aeroflot. On 17 February 1966 at 1:38 am local time a Tupolev Tu-114 crashed during take-off from Sheremetyevo International Airport in Moscow, killing 21 of the 47 passengers and 19 crew members on board.
This was the only fatal incident involving a Tu-114.
A committee investigating the accident found that the crash was due to multiple crew and ATC failures.

Accident
On 16 February at 11:35 pm the crew of flight 065 were preparing for departure and received a weather report of visibility , with mist, light snow and a relative humidity of 100 percent. Recent snow had been cleared from the runway but not from its full  width.

At 1:37 am the aircraft crew radioed the control tower requesting the actual visibility and the controller reported . The controller later testified that he counted the runway edge lights he could see looking down the runway.

At 1:38 am the aircraft began its take-off roll one degree to the right of the runway center line. Approximately 30 seconds later the aircraft was  down the runway when the crew realized they were approaching the plowed snow on the right edge and overcorrected to the left four degrees. When the aircraft reached ,  down the runway the pilot rotated the nose wheels off the ground. The left main gear then impacted a runway edge light. Instead of aborting the take-off the pilot banked right, striking the propellers of engines 3 and 4 on the runway. The aircraft then spun to the right, flipped over and burst into flames. The forward fuselage and main wing section were completely destroyed. The force of the impact tore away the tail section and it came to rest inverted separated from the burning forward section. Many of the survivors were seated in this part of the aircraft.

Aircraft
The accident aircraft was a Tupolev Tu-114 with aircraft registration CCCP 76491 and manufacturer's serial number 64M472. The airliner was manufactured in 1964, delivered to Aeroflot on 12 December of that year and entered service on 18 November 1965; it was the last Tu-114 produced.

Investigation
In a report released 12 May 1966 the investigating board indicated the main causes of the crash were errors made by the aircraft crew and poor organization of the airport traffic control service. Contributing factors included limited visibility in poor weather conditions and failure to properly clear the runway of snow.

See also
Aeroflot accidents and incidents
Aeroflot accidents and incidents in the 1960s

References

Aviation accidents and incidents in the Soviet Union
Aviation accidents and incidents in Russia
Aviation accidents and incidents in 1966
Accidents and incidents involving the Tupolev Tu-114
1966 in the Soviet Union
65
1966 in Russia
February 1966 events in Europe
Aviation accidents and incidents caused by air traffic controller error